The  is a 11.3 km railway line owned by Iyotetsu. The line connects Matsuyama with Iyo in Ehime Prefecture, Japan. The line runs southwards from Matsuyama City Station, terminating at Gunchū Port Station. 

The line used to be owned by the South Iyo Railway until they merged with Iyotetsu in 1900.

Operations
The line is electrified with overhead lines and is single-tracked for the entire line.

Stations
All stations are located in Ehime Prefecture.

References

Iyotetsu Gunchū Line
Railway lines in Japan
Rail transport in Ehime Prefecture
Railway lines opened in 1896